Enrique Pla y Deniel (December 19, 1876 – July 5, 1968) was a Spanish cardinal of the Roman Catholic Church. He came from a rich Barcelona family and trained at the local seminary and the Gregorian University in Rome before an early career in journalism and seminary teaching.  He took possession of the Salamancan see in 1935. "His seven years in Salamanca, from where he played a crucial role in the construction of General Franco's crusade, were rewarded with elevation to the primatial see of Toledo". He served as Archbishop of Toledo from 1941 until his death, and he was elevated to the cardinalate in 1946 by Pope Pius XII.

Biography
Enrique Pla y Deniel was born in Barcelona, and studied at the seminary there before attending the Pontifical Gregorian University and the Angelicum in Rome. Ordained to the priesthood on July 25, 1900, he completed his studies in 1903 and then did pastoral work in Barcelona, where he also served as a seminary professor, director of several newspapers, and cathedral canon.

On December 4, 1918, Deniel was appointed Bishop of Ávila by Pope Benedict XV. He received his episcopal consecration on June 8, 1919, from Archbishop Francesco Ragonesi, with Bishops Enrique Reig y Casanova and Francisco Mas y Oliver serving as co-consecrators. Deniel was later translated to Bishop of Salamanca on January 28, 1935.

On September 30, 1936, Plá issued his famous pastoral letter "The Two Cities", and  made his adherence to the insurgents' cause perfectly plain when he vacated the episcopal palace on October 6 in favour of Francisco Franco. His letter was the first lengthy episcopal consideration of the claim to be waging a just war. In it he reiterated St. Augustine's distinction between the terrestrial city, where selfishness prevails, and the celestial city, where love of God replaces all sense of self, and he depicted Spain divided into just such cities; "communism and anarchism are the very ideology leading to the disdain, the hatred for God Our lord; and against them heroism and martyrdom have flourished." The construction of the "earthly city of those without God" had been met by a "heavenly city of God's children". Plá concluded that Thomas Aquinas' conditions for a just war had been met. A rising against the loyalists had been justified. Although, in the eyes of the world, the conflict might have the external appearance of a civil war, in reality it was a crusade. The rebellion had been to re-establish civil order. The Church had to speak out in favour of order, hierarchical government, Christian civilization, religion, fatherland and family. On the same day that Plá y Deniel issued his most famous pastoral letter, General Francisco Franco was proclaimed head of state. The bishop immediately sent a telegram of congratulation anticipating the "glorious resurrection of Christian Spain".

Pope Pius XII named Deniel Archbishop of Toledo, and thus primate of the Church in Spain, on October 3, 1941. He was created cardinal-priest of San Pietro in Montorio by Pope Pius in the consistory of February 18, 1946. Deniel was one of the cardinal-electors who participated in the 1958 papal conclave, which selected Pope John XXIII. From 1962 to 1965, he attended the Second Vatican Council, and sat on its board of presidency.

The Spanish cardinal was considered conservative in his views. Although he was a supporter of General Franco (particularly during the Spanish Civil War), Deniel refused to fire a prominent priest from his post as editor of a Catholic Action newspaper after the latter attacked Spain's press censorship; he did, however, privately suspend the priest. Deniel voted in another conclave, that of 1963, which resulted in the election of Pope Paul VI.

Deniel died in Toledo, at age 91. He is buried in the Cathedral of Toledo.

Trivia
He presided over the marriage of Franco's daughter María.
Pope Paul VI visited the ill cardinal on the day after his election to the papacy.

References

External links
Cardinals of the Holy Roman Church
Catholic-Hierarchy

1876 births
1968 deaths
People from Barcelona
Cardinals created by Pope Pius XII
Bishops of Salamanca
Archbishops of Toledo
20th-century Spanish cardinals
Participants in the Second Vatican Council
20th-century Roman Catholic archbishops in Spain